Aspen Meadows is a 40-acre conference center and resort located amongst the Rocky Mountains in Aspen, Colorado. It is owned by the Aspen Institute, operated by Dolce Hotels and Resorts, and is the venue for some of the institute's most notable events, such as the annual Aspen Ideas Festival and Socrates Program seminars. It was designed by Herbert Bayer in the Bauhaus style.

History 

The Goethe Bicentennial Convocation and Music Festival, organized by Walter Paepcke, was held in Aspen in 1949 in an amphitheater tent designed by Eero Saarinen. The success of the gathering led to the creation of the Aspen Institute. Programming was initially held in rotating locations, but by 1952 the institute's Executive Seminar needed a dedicated, purpose-built space and Paepcke purchased land for the institute from the Aspen Company (another Paepcke organization, which he had previously directed to purchase 100 acres of property in the Aspen Meadows). The first permanent building, the Executive Seminar building, was built in 1953.

Buildings

Walter Issacson Center

Madeleine K. Albright Pavilion

Kresge Building

Koch Seminar Building 

When the Executive Seminar first began it didn't have a permanent space to use so its location varied from day to day. By 1952, the varied locations were problematic enough for Walter Paepcke to be convinced that a permanent, purpose-built space was needed. Mortimer J. Adler was consulted as to the ideal needs for the building and Herbert Bayer, in consultation with Fritz Benedict, were charged with designing and supervising the construction of the Executive Seminar Building. It was built at a cost of $52,000 (1953 dollars) and became the first permanent Institute building. The building consists of two large hexagonal shaped seminar rooms and several smaller offices.

Walter Paepcke Memorial Building

Boettcher Seminar Building

Doerr-Hosier Center 

Named after anchor donors Gerald D. Hosier and John Doerr, the 22,000 square foot Doerr-Hosier Center was designed by architect Jeff Berkus and built at a cost of $12.5m. It opened on June 8, 2007, and achieved LEED Gold certification. Spaces include: McNulty Gathering Room (capacity: 250–320); Kaufman Room (capacity: 80); Catto Terrace Room (capacity: 24–32); Resnick Art Gallery; and Isaacson History Room.

The building features a red sandstone wall designed by British sculptor Andy Goldsworthy made of rocks from China, Jordan, India, and Colorado. The sandstone "river" begins outside the building's entrance, moves through a reflecting pool, flows through the McNulty Gathering Room, and emerges out the other side to follow the Roaring Fork River.

Greenwald Pavilion

Guest Buildings

Buckminster-Fuller Geodesic Dome

Trustee Townhomes

See also 

The Aspen Music Festival and School and the Aspen Center for Physics are both connected to the Aspen Meadows Resort property.

References 

Resorts in Colorado
Buildings and structures in Aspen, Colorado